Pemba is a port city and district in Mozambique. It is the capital of the province of Cabo Delgado and lies on a peninsula in Pemba Bay.

The town was founded by the Niassa Company in 1904 as Porto Amélia, after the Queen of Portugal, at the peninsula's northwestern tip and has grown around a port.  The city is renowned for its Portuguese colonial architecture. It was renamed Pemba at the end of Portuguese rule, in 1975. The city's inhabitants are primarily Swahili, Makondes, Macuas and Mwanis.  Local languages that are spoken are Kimwani and Macua, although Portuguese is widespread.

Pemba is also renowned as being a prime destination for water sport and diving enthusiasts as a coral reef lies close to the shore. It has increasingly become a tourist destination, particularly for upper-middle-class Mozambicans and South Africans. There are now 5 flights a week from Johannesburg to Pemba, several hotels, restaurants, and other forms of entertainment. In the centre of Pemba, there is an authentic local market or souk, where arts and crafts, as well as traditional silverware can be bought. Pemba is the closest major city and airport for those who wish to visit the Quirimbas Islands and Quirimbas National Park.

History 
Pemba is taking refugees in the aftermath of the Battle of Palma.

International relations
Pemba is twinned with:

 Aveiro, Portugal
 Reggio Emilia, Italy

Demographics

Port 

Pemba is a potential site for a deepwater port.

Municipality 
The municipality of Pemba covers 100 km2 and recorded 201,846 people in the 2017 census.  The actual settlement, however, is mostly just the tip facing into the bay, with most of the land undeveloped.

Climate
Pemba has a tropical savanna climate (Köppen climate classification Aw). Temperatures fluctuate little throughout the year due to the city's tropical location and closeness to the equator. It has only two seasons. Humidity is very high during the wet season, averaging 80-90%, but is much lower in the dry season. The warmest months are January and February and the coolest is July.

See also
 Pemba Airport
 Southern African Development Community Mission in Mozambique (SAMIM)

References 

Populated places in Cabo Delgado Province
Provincial capitals in Mozambique
Populated places established in 1904